The Santa Anita Mathis Mile Stakes is a Grade II American thoroughbred horse race for three-year-olds over a distance of one mile on the turf held annually in late December Santa Anita Park in Arcadia, California, USA.  The event currently offers a purse of US$200,000.

History

The inaugural running of the event was on 26 December 2000 as the Sir Beaufort Stakes, opening day of 2000–01 Santa Anita Park's Winter meeting. The event attracted eight entrants and was won by Edmund A. Gann's Fateful Dream, who was trained by US Hall of Fame trainer Bobby Frankel and ridden by US Hall of Fame jockey Kent Desormeaux by one length in a time of 1:35.01 on a turf course that was rated as firm.

The event was named after the 1993 Santa Anita Handicap winner Sir Beaufort.

In 2003 the event was moved off the turf and run on a dirt track.

In 2005 the event was run in split divisions.

The following year, 2006, the American Graded Stakes Committee classified the event as Grade III and in 2011 the event was upgraded again to Grade II.

Due to poor racecourse conditions as a result of wet weather, the race was switched to the synthetic track in 2008 and to the dirt track in 2010.

The event was renamed the Mathis Brothers Mile Stakes in 2014 under a marketing agreement between Santa Anita Park and Mathis Brothers Furniture.

The event was run once more on the dirt in 2021. However, after review the Grade II status was reinstated.

Records
Speed  record:
1 mile on turf: 1:33.46 - Bowies  Hero (2017) 
1 mile on turf: 1:33.70 - Sidney's Candy (2010)

Margins:
 lengths  - Sidney's Candy (2010)

Most wins by an owner:
 2 - Triple B Farms (2004, 2005)

Most wins by a jockey:
 3 - Kent Desormeaux (2000, 2005, 2017)

Most wins by a trainer:
 2 - Robert J. Frankel (2000, 2002)
 2 - Douglas F. O'Neill (2004, 2005)
 2 -  Philip D'Amato (2016, 2017)
 2 -  Michael McCarthy (2020, 2021)

Winners

Legend:

See also
List of American and Canadian Graded races

References

Turf races in the United States
Horse races in California
Graded stakes races in the United States
Grade 2 stakes races in the United States
Flat horse races for three-year-olds
Recurring sporting events established in 2000
Santa Anita Park
2000 establishments in California